The Saab Toad, or Paddan in Swedish, was a development car Saab Automobile made in 1966 to test out the new chassis, drive train and engine for the Saab 99.

Background
On 2 April 1965, Gudmund's day in Sweden, after several years of planning, the Saab board started Project Gudmund. This was a project to develop a new and larger car to replace the Saab 96. This new car became the Saab 99, designed by Sixten Sason and unveiled in Stockholm on 22 November 1967.

Overview

The reason for this project was to preserve secrecy during development of the new model, the Saab 99, which was the company's first radically new body shape since the first cars made in 1947. This was achieved by cutting the body in half lengthwise and inserting 20 cm of steel spacer. The windscreen (windshield) and rear window clearly showed the seam. The bonnet (hood) and grille required widening in a different way, to prevent changing the appearance of the centrally-placed features, as the picture shows. The Triumph inline four engine of the future Saab 99 replaced the Ford Taunus V4 engine of the Saab 96.

The Toad project was quite short-lived. It was rightly believed that the wider body would not be noticed on Sweden's roads, where so many SAAB 96 cars were an everyday sight. This deception was successful, for a while, until test drivers allowed a grey Toad to be followed by a similarly-colored SAAB 96, making the different proportions obvious to any observer.

Four Saab Toads were made, but only one remains, in dark gray paintwork. It is currently on display in the SAAB museum in Trollhättan, Sweden.

Post-Saab Toad

Further development was carried out on the SAAB Daihatsu, a test car with the new body but badged "Daihatsu", to prevent its identification by journalists as a developmental SAAB. This vehicle is on display in the SAAB Museum in Trollhättan.

External links
Paddan comparison

Non-Working link as of 8 December 2014
Paddan picture

Front-wheel-drive vehicles
Toad